Charles Geerts (29 October 1930 – 31 January 2015) was a Belgian former international footballer who played as a goalkeeper.

Career
Born in Antwerp, Geerts played club football for Beerschot VAC. He earned one cap for Belgium in 1954, and participated at the 1954 FIFA World Cup.

References

External links
 

1930 births
2015 deaths
Belgian footballers
Belgium international footballers
1954 FIFA World Cup players
Association football goalkeepers